Charles Royal LeDuff (born April 1, 1966) is an American journalist, writer, and media personality.  He is the host of the No BS News Hour with Charlie LeDuff. LeDuff was employed by The New York Times for 12 years, then employed by The Detroit News, leaving in October 2010 after two years to join the Detroit Fox affiliate WJBK Channel 2 to do on-air journalism. LeDuff left Fox 2 Detroit on December 1, 2016. LeDuff has won a number of prestigious journalism awards, including a Pulitzer Prize, but has also faced accusations of plagiarism and distortion in his career, to which he has responded.

Biography
Charlie LeDuff was born in Portsmouth, Virginia. He is one eighth Ojibway. He discovered as an adult that his paternal grandfather was Creole (of African and French descent).

LeDuff grew up in Westland, Michigan. He attended Winston Churchill High School in Livonia, Michigan and the University of Michigan. At the University of Michigan, LeDuff was a brother of the Theta Delta Chi fraternity. His father served in the U.S. Navy. His parents' marriage ended in divorce. He has a deceased sister and stepbrother. LeDuff has four surviving siblings. He has lived in many cities around the country and the world. Before joining The New York Times, LeDuff worked as a schoolteacher and carpenter in Michigan and a cannery hand in Alaska. He has also worked as a baker in Denmark.

LeDuff currently lives with his wife, Amy Kuzniar, and his daughter in Pleasant Ridge, Michigan, a northern suburb of Detroit. He considers himself a political independent, and is a practicing Roman Catholic.  LeDuff is also a member of the Sault Ste. Marie Chippewa tribe of Michigan.

Writing career

LeDuff's stated writing influences include the books Hop on Pop, To Kill a Mockingbird, The Grapes of Wrath, Treasure Island, and writers Mickey Spillane, Raymond Carver, Joseph Mitchell, Ernest Hemingway, Dorothy Parker, and Raymond Chandler. Among writers in the newspaper business who influenced him, LeDuff lists Mike Royko, Jimmy Breslin, and Pete Hamill.

Journalism

After graduating from the University of California, Berkeley Graduate School of Journalism, LeDuff was hired by The New York Times on a ten-week minority scholarship. He was a staff reporter at The Times from 1995 to 2007, ending his tenure as a member of the Los Angeles bureau. LeDuff, who had been on paternity leave, quit The Times to pursue the promotion of his second book, US Guys, according to a memorandum from Suzanne Daley, the national editor. The next day LeDuff said his rationale for leaving was more complicated, noting that he made an appointment with Arthur Sulzberger Jr., the publisher and chairman of The Times, to say he would be leaving because, "I can't write the things I want to say. I want to talk about race, I want to talk about class. I want to talk about the things we should be talking about."

Of his professional career in newspapers, LeDuff states:

I’m not a journalist, I’m a reporter. The difference between a reporter and a journalist is that a journalist can type without looking. The problem with journalism is its self-importance. Like in the New York Times, there’s style guides; you can’t call a doctor a physician, you got to call him a doctor- too high falutin’. You can’t call an undertaker a mortician- too high falutin’; you got to call him an undertaker. You can’t call a lawyer an attorney, you have to call him a lawyer. But somehow, since we control it, and we’re very self-important people, you can call a reporter a journalist.  

LeDuff is best known as a contributor to the 2001 Pulitzer Prize-winning New York Times series "How Race Is Lived in America"; a ten part series including a piece by LeDuff called "At a Slaughterhouse Some Things Never Die". In 1999 the Columbia University School of Journalism gave him its Mike Berger Award for distinguished writing about New York City.

From August to November 2006, LeDuff wrote an eight-part series for The New York Times called American Album. The series was composed of articles and videos presenting "portraits of offbeat Americans". The profiles included pieces about "a Latina from the rough side of Dallas" who "works the lobster shift at a Burger King," a Minuteman and an Alaska national guardsman believed to be the first Inuit, or Eskimo, killed because of the Iraq war. LeDuff has covered the war in Iraq, crossed the border with Mexican migrants, and chronicled a Brooklyn fire house in the aftermath of 9/11.

Controversy
LeDuff has been repeatedly accused of plagiarism and of reporting inaccuracies, to which he has responded.

A 1995 article for The East Bay Monthly was examined by Modern Luxury's San Francisco publication in a February 2004 article titled "Charlie LeDuff's Bay Area Secret" following suggestions that LeDuff had plagiarized elements of Ted Conover's book Rolling Nowhere: Riding the Rails With America's Hoboes.

A January 18, 2003, article for The New York Times entitled "As an American Armada Leaves San Diego, Tears Are the Rule of the Day" was accused of featuring inaccurate quotations and depictions of two of the ten subjects interviewed, according to an article published in September 2003 by Marvin Olasky in the evangelical WORLD magazine. According to Olasky, Lieutenant Commander Beidler, a subject profiled with his wife in the man-on-the-street piece, recalled saying something else to LeDuff and believed the quotes and depictions of himself and his wife used were inaccurate and fabricated by LeDuff. According to Olasky, Times senior editor Bill Borders wrote to Beidler, saying that he had "thoroughly looked into your complaint" and concluding "[Mr. LeDuff] thinks that he accurately represented his interview with you and your wife, and therefore so do I."

A December 8, 2003, article for The New York Times entitled "Los Angeles by Kayak: Vistas of Concrete Banks" was accused of drawing from Blake Gumprecht's 1999 book The Los Angeles River: Its Life, Death, and Possible Rebirth. One week later, on December 15, 2003, The New York Times appended a clarification:

LeDuff discussed various accusations made against his reporting in a March 11, 2008, interview with essayist Dan Schneider.
 

In 2011, LeDuff was sued for defamation over a story he wrote in The Detroit News. A Detroit police officer alleged that LeDuff's stories asserted that she moonlighted as a stripper and danced at a never-proven party at the Detroit mayor's mansion. The officer denied both accusations. The suit was ultimately dismissed.

Other writings 

LeDuff is the author of four books: 
 Sh*tshow!: The Country's Collapsing and the Ratings Are Great, 2018
 Detroit: An American Autopsy, 2013
 US Guys: The True and Twisted Mind of the American Man, 2008
 Work and Other Sins: Life in New York City and Thereabouts, 2005

Television career

LeDuff worked on an experimental project for The Times with the Discovery Channel and produced a show called Only in America, which featured participatory journalism where LeDuff played on a semi-professional football team, raced with thoroughbreds, performed in a gay rodeo, joined the circus, preached in Appalachia, joined the elite world of New York models and played one play on special teams for the af2 football club, the Amarillo Dusters.

On July 14, 2006, LeDuff starred in and narrated a documentary on the British channel BBC Four called United Gates of America in which he experienced life with the mainly white, Christian, and middle-class citizens of the gated community Canyon Lake in Riverside County, California.

As of December 2, 2010, LeDuff is a reporter for WJBK, the Fox affiliate in Detroit, Michigan. In 2012, a YouTube video of his reporting on Meals on Wheels became one of the top links of all time on the social network Reddit. His series The Americans, human interest stories about the changing American economy and culture, is syndicated to other Fox Television Stations Group stations for airing on their newscasts.

On November 10, 2013, LeDuff was prominently featured on a Detroit focused episode of the CNN series Anthony Bourdain: Parts Unknown. In February 2015, Vice News announced LeDuff would be a regular contributor. On December 1, 2016, LeDuff announced that he would be leaving WJBK Fox 2 Detroit; he plans to stay in Michigan. Since 2016, LeDuff has been an employee of American Coney Island diner, working as the restaurant's handyman, while writing a book on the side. In 2018, he became a weekly columnist for Deadline Detroit.

On October 22, 2018, it was announced that LeDuff would return to broadcasting on WFDF (AM). It is rumored that he may host a show on WADL (TV).

Radio and podcasting career 
In September 2018 LeDuff launched The No BS News Hour with Charlie LeDuff, a podcast featuring news commentary with a Detroit-centric bent. In October 2018 Detroit radio station 910 AM began airing the show—although the station manager admitted the station had to do "a lot of bleeping". The show is part of a "podcast mini-empire" started by Detroit radio personality Drew Lane.

References

External links

 
 
 LeDuff's page at the Detroit News
 LeDuff TV interview with Charlie Rose
 
 

The New York Times writers
1966 births
Living people
American people of Ojibwe descent
American people of Creole descent
American people of Breton descent
American political writers
American male non-fiction writers
The Detroit News people
University of Michigan alumni
Amarillo Dusters players
People from Pleasant Ridge, Michigan
Native American radio personalities